Statistics of Swiss Super League in the 1902–03 season.

East

Central

West

Final

Table

Results 

|colspan="3" style="background-color:#D0D0D0" align=center|22 March 1903

|-
|colspan="3" style="background-color:#D0D0D0" align=center|29 March 1903

|}
The match between Zürich and Neuchâtel was not played because the two teams no longer competing for the title. 

Young Boys Bern won the championship.

Sources 
 Switzerland 1902-03 at RSSSF

Seasons in Swiss football
Swiss Football League seasons
1902–03 in Swiss football
Swiss